Samantha Nugent is the current alderman of the 39th ward of the City of Chicago. Nugent won the 39th Ward general runoff election on April 2, 2019, after advancing from the general election on February 26, 2019.

See also
List of Chicago aldermen since 1923

References

External links

1977 births
21st-century American politicians
Chicago City Council members
Illinois Democrats
Living people
Place of birth missing (living people)
Women city councillors in Illinois
21st-century American women politicians